The Canton Legends was a professional indoor football team based out of Canton, Ohio. They were a charter member of the American Indoor Football Association, which played their first season under the name Atlantic Indoor Football League, and their second season as the American Indoor Football League. They played their home games at Canton Memorial Civic Center. The team name is in reference to the Pro Football Hall of Fame, since Canton is where the building is located.

During their inaugural season, the Legends ended up at a mediocre 3–7, just beating the Raleigh Rebels for 4th Place in the league. Since the league only had six teams, everyone (including the Legends) made the playoffs. They won the opening round against the Rebels, but their season ended when they lost to the Erie Freeze in the semifinals.

On Saturday, May 6, 2006, the Legends won 54–41 against the Huntington Heroes on the road, but not without controversy.  The Legends were in violation for having an illegal roster, for they added some players to their rosters illegally. At first the AIFL awarded the win to Huntington; later Canton got the win, but had to pay an $800 fine for its actions.

Despite that little controversy, the Legends eventually managed to win the AIFL's ultimate title for 2006, beating the Rome Renegades 61–40.

The legends also held an AIFA record for longest winning streak (12 games), beginning on May 6, 2006, against the Huntington Heroes (the same Heroes game mentioned above) at Veterans Memorial Fieldhouse, and ending on March 11, 2007, with a 39–36 loss to the Lakeland Thunderbolts at the Lakeland Center. (The Baltimore Mariners later broke this record in 2010.) The Legends are also the last of the six charter AIFL teams to fold, ceasing operations only four seasons after its debut. (Johnstown and Erie folded in 2007 and the other three teams folded in 2006.)

Season-by-season

|-
| colspan="6" align="center" | Canton Legends (AIFL)
|-
|2005 || 3 || 7 || 0 || 4th League || Won Round 1 (Raleigh)Lost League Semifinals (Erie)
|-
|2006 || 10 || 4 || 0 || 2nd Northern || Won Round 1 (Erie)Won Northern Division Championship (Reading)Won American Bowl II (Rome)
|-
| colspan="6" align="center" | Canton Legends (AIFA)
|-
|2007 || 10 || 4 || 0 || 2nd Northern || Won Round 1 (Huntington)Lost NC Championship (Reading)
|-
|2008 || 3 || 11 || 0 || 4th EC Northern || 
|-
!Totals || 31 || 28 || 0
|colspan="2"| (including playoffs)

Entire 2006 Season Schedule

2007 Season Schedule

2008 Season Schedule

External links 
 Official Site of the Canton Legends
 Canton Leatherheads(Legends fan club) website
 Around the Turf, a Canton Legends fan blog
 Legends' 2005 Stats
 Legends' 2006 Season & Results
 Legends' 2007 Season
 Legends' 2008 Season

American Indoor Football Association teams
American Indoor Football League teams
Sports in Canton, Ohio
2005 establishments in Ohio
2008 disestablishments in Ohio
American football teams established in 2005
Defunct American football teams in Ohio
American football teams disestablished in 2008
American football teams in Ohio